King's Highway 10, commonly referred to as Highway 10 and Hurontario Street,  is a provincially maintained highway in the Canadian province of Ontario. The highway connects the northern end of Highway 410 just north of Brampton with Owen Sound on the southern shores of Georgian Bay, passing through the towns of Orangeville and Shelburne as well as several smaller villages along the way. It historically followed the Toronto–Sydenham Road, the southern part of which later became known as Hurontario Street. The section between Orangeville and Primrose was formerly part of Prince of Wales Road, which continues northwards after the highway turns west.
Between Chatsworth and Owen Sound, Highway10 is concurrent with Highway 6.

Highway10 was established in 1920 as one of the original provincial highways in Ontario, connecting Highway 5 in Cooksville with Owen Sound. It was extended south by 1937 to Highway 2 in Port Credit. That same year, it became the site of the first highway interchange in Canada at its intersection with The Middle Road. Since the late 1990s, the southern portion has been truncated to its current terminus north of the Brampton–Caledon border.

Route description 

Highway10 begins at the northern end of Highway410 in Caledon, immediately north of Brampton. It follows Hurontario Street, a route originally carved through the virgin forests of Upper Canada in 1848. Like the pioneer route it supplanted, the modern highway still divides many of the towns it serves. Within the Regional Municipality of Peel it acts as the meridian of the concession road system, with parallel sidelines described as being east or west of Hurontario (EHS and WHS, repsectively) and perpendicular concession roads divided into eastern and western segments.

Passing to the west of Valleywood, a suburban community on the fringe of the Greater Toronto Area, Highway10 begins as Highway410 transitions from a divided freeway to a four-lane rural route with a centre turn lane. The highway presses north-northwest through farmland and rises gradually over the Niagara Escarpment, a UNESCO World Biosphere Reserve. To the west are the Forks of the Credit, a deep glacial ravine and provincial park renowned for its scenery. It passes between several large quarries and through Caledon Village before entering Orangeville at Highway 9, where it diverges from Hurontario Street.

Highway10 passes to the east of Orangeville on a bypass, switching between Hurontario Street and Prince of Wales Road alignments to avoid the business district. At the north end of the bypass, the highway curves and proceeds northward. It narrows to four lanes immediately north of Orangeville and then to two lanes north of Camilla, which along with Elba is one of two communities interspersed among the farmland that otherwise occupies the distance between Orangeville and Shelburne. At the hamlet of Primrose, Highway10 turns west and becomes concurrent with Highway 89 into the town of Shelburne. The concurrency ends in the centre of Shelburne, as Highway10 branches north.

From Shelburne to Owen Sound, the road follows the northernmost part of the former Toronto–Sydenham Road, a colonization road that predates the division of the land in the area. As such, the road follows a diagonal path relative to the survey grid. While it generally passes through farmland, it also bisects the communities of Melancthon, Corbetton, Dundalk, Flesherton—where it meets a former portion of Highway 4—Markdale, Mount Pleasant, Berkeley and Arnott before meeting Highway 6 at Chatsworth. The two highways travel north for approximately  through the community of Rockford. Highway10 ends at 10th Street East, where it meets the western terminus of Highway 26 as well as the northern terminus of Highway 21. Highway6 continues northwest, concurrent with Highway21 through Owen Sound.

History 

Historically, Highway 10 follows the 19th-century stagecoach route known as the Toronto–Sydenham Road (the southern half of which later became absorbed into Hurontario Street). It travelled north from Dundas Street (later Highway 5) in Cooksville through Brampton, Orangeville and Shelburne to Owen Sound.

In order to be eligible for federal funding, the Department of Public Highways (DPHO) established a network of provincial highways on February26, 1920.
Portions of the network were then assumed by the DPHO over the following year. The section of Highway10 within Dufferin County between Orangeville and Dundalk was taken over on July8, 1920. This was followed several weeks later by the portion within Peel County (now Peel Region) between Cooksville and Orangeville on July22. Finally, the DPHO assumes the portion within Grey County on October6.
It was later extended south from Cooksville when the provincial government assumed the remaining stretch to Lakeshore Road (Highway 2) in Port Credit, on the north shore of Lake Ontario, on March16, 1921.
Until the mid-1920s, highways in Ontario were named rather than numbered. The  Sydenham Highway was designated as Provincial Highway10 in the summer of 1925.

While initially unpaved,
construction of a hard surface along Highway10 began in 1923. That year saw completion of paving between Port Credit and Cooksville, as well as between Chatsworth and Owen Sound.
Paving was completed between Cooksville and Brampton in 1925,
Further paving in 1928 and 1929 resulted in the highway having a continuous pavement from Port Credit to Dundalk.
Pavement was laid in and near the villages of Flesherton and Markdale in 1931,
and between Dundalk and Markdale in 1934.
The pavement was extended from Markdale to Berkeley in 1936, leaving an approximately  gap between Berkeley and Chatsworth.
This final gravel section was graded and paved in 1937 and 1938.

Highway10 initially entered Owen Sound along 9th Avenue East, before turning west onto 6th Street East, then north along 2nd Avenue East to Highway21 and Highway26 at 10th Avenue East.
The official Ontario road maps published between 1947 and 1967 show the route following 3rd Avenue East instead of 2nd Avenue East. Beginning in 1968, the combined highways followed 9th Avenue East directly to 10th Street East, as they do today.
Within Orangeville, Highway10 formerly turned west onto Highway 9 and ran concurrently with it through downtown along Broadway, then turned north to follow First Street (the Prince of Wales Road alignment).
In mid-1971, a bypass around Orangeville was completed, bypassing a short section of the Hurontario Street alignment.

As Mississauga was established in 1968 from Toronto Township (which included Cooksville), and later Port Credit, and began to rapidly urbanize and as Brampton grew during the same period, portions of Highway10 were designated as connecting links and transferred to municipal maintenance through the two cities. On April1, 1970, a  segment of the route, from the Port Credit railway underpass to Burnhamthorpe Road, was designated as such. This was followed on December10, 1970, with the creation of a  connecting link between Steeles Avenue to south of Clarence Street near downtown Brampton. In 1997, these connecting links were repealed and the highway designation dropped altogether through those cities, shortening the highway to its present length. 

In 2009, a major project to widen two-lane sections of the southern portions of the highway was completed, and the highway is now four lanes wide from Highway 410 north to Camilla. From Shelburne north to Owen Sound, it remains a two-lane highway with several passing lanes in hillier regions.

During winter, the northern stretches of the highway that pass through the snowbelt region of Grey County are subject to poor visibility and road closings during windy conditions or winter storms.

Major intersections

See also
Hurontario Street

References 

Sources

Bibliography

External links 

 Highway 10 pictures and information

010
Transport in Orangeville, Ontario
Transport in Owen Sound
Transport in Grey County